The 1979 Coppa Italia Final was the final of the 1978–79 Coppa Italia. The match was played on 17 May 1979 between Juventus and Palermo. Juventus won 2–1 after extra time.

Match

References 
Coppa Italia 1978/79 statistics at rsssf.com
 https://www.calcio.com/calendario/ita-coppa-italia-1978-1979-finale/2/
 https://www.worldfootball.net/schedule/ita-coppa-italia-1978-1979-finale/2/

Coppa Italia Finals
Coppa Italia Final 1979
Coppa Italia Final 1979